Crinipellis sarmentosa is a species of fungus in the family Marasmiaceae. It is a plant pathogen.

References 

Fungal plant pathogens and diseases
Marasmiaceae